Mor Moharan is a Pakistani television series that premiered on TV One on 10 May 2022, directed and Owais Khan and written by Ali Moeen. It stars Sonya Hussyn and Zahid Ahmed in lead roles with Mustafa Changazi, Samiya Mumtaz, Adnan Jaffar, Babar Ali and Firdous Jamal in supporting roles. The series aired simultaneously on PTV Home.

Plot 

Rohi, a graduate in environmental science of  comes to her house after getting higher education from Punjab University, Lahore. On reaching her hometown, she observes that the women of her area have to travel long distances for fetching water as there is a dearth of the water in the Cholistan. She then decides to help them in her own way and tells about it to her father who is a respectable and well-known man of the region. She uses her her education and her father's position to solve this problem.

Cast 
 Sonya Hussyn as Rohi
 Zahid Ahmed as Gurdezi
 Mustafa Changazi as Sikandar
 Samiya Mumtaz as Almas
 Baber Ali as Sher Aalam
 Adnan Jaffar as Nawab Feroze
 Firdous Jamal as Malook Shah
 Salma Asim as Heer

Production 
The project was first announced by Hussyn through her Instagram account on 9 March 2021. Initially, Mikaal Zulfiqar was selected as a male lead but later he was replaced by Ahmed. Principal photography began on 4 February 2021 in Cholistan/ Rohi, Bahawalpur. 

Mor Moharan is the third collaboration of Hussyn with Ahmed after Ishq Zahe Naseeb (2019) and Mohabbat Tujhe Alvida (2020)
 while it also marked her second collaboration with director Owais Khan after Marasim (2014).

The initial teasers were released on 28 October 2021. It was slated to air in December 2021, however its release got postponed and later premiere in May 2022.

References 

Pakistani drama television series
2022 Pakistani television series debuts